Marquess of Exeter is a title that has been created twice, once in the Peerage of England and once in the Peerage of the United Kingdom. The first creation came in the Peerage of England in 1525 for Henry Courtenay, 2nd Earl of Devon. For more information on this creation, which was forfeited in 1538, see Earl of Devon.

History
The title is chiefly associated with the Cecil family, descended from the courtier Sir Richard Cecil of the parish of Stamford Baron St Martin in Northamptonshire. His only son, Sir William Cecil, was a prominent statesman and served as Secretary of State, Lord High Treasurer and Lord Privy Seal. In 1571 he was created Baron Burghley, in the County of Northampton, in the Peerage of England. His son from his second marriage to Mildred Cooke, Sir Robert Cecil, was created Earl of Salisbury in 1605 and is the ancestor of the Marquesses of Salisbury. Lord Burghley was succeeded by his son from his first marriage to Mary Cheke, Thomas, the second Baron. He represented Stamford, Lincolnshire and Northamptonshire in the House of Commons, served as Lord Lieutenant of Yorkshire and as President of the Council of the North and was also a distinguished soldier. In 1605 Thomas Cecil was created Earl of Exeter in the Peerage of England (on the same day his half-brother was created Earl of Salisbury).

Thomas was succeeded by his eldest son William Cecil, the second Earl. He served as Lord Lieutenant of Northamptonshire. Lord Exeter married as his first wife Elizabeth, 16th Baroness de Ros. Their son William succeeded his mother in the barony at the age of one. However, he died childless during his father's lifetime (when the barony was inherited by his cousin Francis Manners, 6th Earl of Rutland). Lord Exeter had no other sons and was succeeded by his nephew, the third Earl. He was the son of Sir Richard Cecil, second son of the first Earl. He represented Peterborough in the Short Parliament. His son, the fourth Earl, was Lord Lieutenant of Northamptonshire. He was succeeded by his son, the fifth Earl. He sat as Member of Parliament for Northamptonshire.

His son, the sixth Earl, represented Rutland in Parliament and served as Lord Lieutenant of Rutland. His second son, the eighth Earl (who succeeded his elder brother), briefly represented Stamford in the House of Commons. His eldest son, the ninth Earl, was Member of Parliament for Rutland and also Lord Lieutenant of that county. He was childless and was succeeded by his nephew, the tenth Earl. He was the son of Thomas Chambers Cecil, second son of the eighth Earl.

Creation as Marquess 
Lord Exeter represented Stamford in Parliament for sixteen years. In 1801 he was created Marquess of Exeter in the Peerage of the United Kingdom.

His son, the second Marquess, was a Tory politician and notably served as Lord Chamberlain of the Household and Lord Steward of the Household. He was succeeded by his son, the third Marquess. He was a Conservative politician and held office as Vice-Chamberlain of the Household and Captain of the Honourable Corps of Gentlemen-at-Arms. His eldest son, the fourth Marquess, represented Northamptonshire North in the House of Commons and served briefly as Vice-Chamberlain of the Household under his kinsman Lord Salisbury. He was succeeded by his son, the fifth Marquess. He was a Colonel in the Royal Field Artillery and served as Lord Lieutenant of Northamptonshire.

His eldest son, the sixth Marquess, was a Conservative politician and prominent athlete and sports official. He won the 400-metre hurdles at the 1928 Summer Olympics and was later President of the International Amateur Athletic Federation and Vice-President of the International Olympic Committee. Lord Exeter also represented Peterborough in the House of Commons and served as Governor of Bermuda. He died without surviving male issue and was succeeded by his younger brother, the seventh Marquess. He was proprietor of a cattle ranch at 100 Mile House, British Columbia, in Canada. In 1954 he became head of the Emissaries of Divine Light, an obscure religious group.  the titles are held by his only son, the eighth Marquess, who succeeded in 1988. He operates the ranch; from 1988 to 1996 he also headed the Emissaries of Divine Light.

Another member of the Cecil family was the naval commander Edward Cecil, 1st Viscount Wimbledon (a title which became extinct on his death in 1638). He was the third son of the first Earl of Exeter. Also, Lord William Cecil, third son of the third Marquess, married Mary, 2nd Baroness Amherst of Hackney. Their grandson William succeeded in the barony in 1919. Another member of this branch of the family is Vice-Admiral Sir Nigel Cecil. The champion racehorse trainer Sir Henry Cecil was the son of Henry Cecil, a younger brother of the third Baron. Lord John Joicey-Cecil, fourth son of the third Marquess, was Conservative Member of Parliament for Stamford.

The marquessate of Exeter is the senior marquessate in the Peerage of the United Kingdom. The Marquesses also hold the title of hereditary Grand Almoner and Lord Paramount of Peterborough.

The ancestral home of the Marquesses of Exeter is Burghley House, near Stamford, Lincolnshire. It is now run by a trust founded by the family. The traditional burial place of the Cecils of Burghley House and the Marquesses of Exeter is the Burghley Chapel in St Martin's Church, Stamford.

Marquess of Exeter, first creation (1525)

 Henry Courtenay, 1st Marquess of Exeter, 2nd Earl of Devon (attainted 1538, executed 1539); for his family, see Earl of Devon.

Barons Burghley (1571)
 William Cecil, 1st Baron Burghley (1521–1598)
 Thomas Cecil, 2nd Baron Burghley (1542–1623) (created Earl of Exeter in 1605)

Earls of Exeter (1605)
Other titles (1st Earl onwards): Baron Burghley (Eng 1571)
 Thomas Cecil, 1st Earl of Exeter (1542–1623)
 William Cecil, 2nd Earl of Exeter (1566–1640)
 David Cecil, 3rd Earl of Exeter (c. 1600–1643)
 John Cecil, 4th Earl of Exeter (1628–1678)
 John Cecil, 5th Earl of Exeter (c. 1648–1700)
 John Cecil, 6th Earl of Exeter (1674–1721)
 John Cecil, 7th Earl of Exeter (c. 1700–1722)
 Brownlow Cecil, 8th Earl of Exeter (1701–1754)
 Brownlow Cecil, 9th Earl of Exeter (1725–1793)
 Henry Cecil, 10th Earl of Exeter (1754–1804) (created Marquess of Exeter in 1801)

Marquesses of Exeter, second creation (1801)
Other titles (1st Marquess onwards): Baron Burghley (Eng 1571), Earl of Exeter (Eng 1605) 
 Henry Cecil, 1st Marquess of Exeter (1754–1804)
 Brownlow Cecil, 2nd Marquess of Exeter (1795–1867)
 William Alleyne Cecil, 3rd Marquess of Exeter (1825–1895)
 Brownlow Henry George Cecil, 4th Marquess of Exeter (1849–1898)
 William Thomas Brownlow Cecil, 5th Marquess of Exeter (1876–1956)
 David George Brownlow Cecil, 6th Marquess of Exeter (1905–1981)
 (William) Martin Alleyne Cecil, 7th Marquess of Exeter (1909–1988)
 (William) Michael Anthony Cecil, 8th Marquess of Exeter (b. 1935)

Notes:
The heir apparent is the present holder's son Anthony John Cecil, Lord Burghley (b. 1970).
The heir apparent's heir presumptive is his fourth cousin (Hugh) William Amherst Cecil, 5th Baron Amherst of Hackney (b. 1968), who is descended from the third son of the third Marquess.
His heir is his only son Jack William Cecil (b. 2001)

Line of succession

 William Cecil, 3rd Marquess of Exeter (1825–1895)
 Brownlow Cecil, 4th Marquess of Exeter (1849–1898)
 William Cecil, 5th Marquess of Exeter (1876–1956)
  (William) Martin Cecil, 7th Marquess of Exeter (1909–1988)
 (William) Michael Cecil, 8th Marquess of Exeter (b. 1935)
(1). Anthony John Cecil, Lord Burghley (born 1970)
Lord William Cecil (1854–1943)  m.  Mary Cecil, 2nd Baroness Amherst of Hackney (1857–1919)
William Amherst Cecil (1886–1914)
 William Cecil, 3rd Baron Amherst of Hackney (1912–1980)
 William Cecil, 4th Baron Amherst of Hackney (1940–2009)
 (2, 1). (Hugh) William Cecil, 5th Baron Amherst of Hackney (born 1968)
(3, 2).Jack William Amherst Cecil (born 2001)
(4, 3).Anthony Henry Amherst Cecil (born 1947)
(5, 4). Henry Edward Amherst Cecil (born 1976)
(6, 5).  George William Amherst Cecil (born 2009)
(7, 6).  Thomas Anthony Amherst Cecil (born 1981)
Henry Kerr Auchmuty Cecil (1914–1942)
male desc. in succession
Alexander James Amherst Burnett of Leys (b. 1973)
male desc. in succession
Henry Richard Amherst Cecil (1943–2013)
male desc. in succession
David Henry Amherst Cecil (1943–2000)
male desc. in succession
Thomas James Amherst Cecil (1887–1955)
Barclay James Amherst Cecil (1913–1987)
male desc. in succession
John Francis Amherst Cecil (1890–1954)
George Henry Vanderbilt Cecil (1925–2020)
male desc. in succession
William Amherst Vanderbilt Cecil (1928–2017)
male desc. in succession
Henry Mitford Amherst Cecil (1893–1962)
Sir Oswald Nigel Amherst Cecil (1925–2017)
male desc. in succession
Lord John Pakenham Joicey-Cecil (1867–1942)
Edward Wilfred George Joicey-Cecil (1912–1985)
male desc. in succession

See also
 Viscount Wimbledon
 Marquess of Salisbury
 Baron de Ros
 Baron Rockley
 Viscount Cecil of Chelwood
 Baron Quickswood
 Baron Amherst of Hackney

Notes

References

 Kidd, Charles, Williamson, David (editors). Debrett's Peerage and Baronetage (1990 edition). New York: St Martin's Press, 1990, 
 

!
Extinct marquessates in the Peerage of England
Marquessates in the Peerage of the United Kingdom
Noble titles created in 1525
Noble titles created in 1801
People from Peterborough
Stamford, Lincolnshire
 
People from Northamptonshire (before 1974)